Medusa is the fifteenth studio album by British gothic metal band Paradise Lost, released on 1 September 2017 via Nuclear Blast.

Musical style, writing, composition
According to guitarist Greg Mackintosh the album  is "be slower, sludgier and more doom-filled than ever before". He also considered it "eight riff-laden monster tracks of sheer Northern misery". Meanwhile, front man Nick Holmes described the record as "...definitely our heaviest album; the heaviest we’ve done. The idea was to keep it simple but dark and heavy, and I think we’ve achieved that." Regarding the album title, he commented that "...when Gregor writes songs, he gives them working titles, so he called one song Medusa.  There’s no real meaning to it. It’s not something I would use in a song and wouldn’t use as a title either. I liked the thought though. When we were kids, Medusa was the scariest character we knew. As I looked into it, I found a lot of different metaphorical meanings that she represents. There was one sentence I read which was ‘Attempts to avoid looking into her eyes represent avoiding the ostensibly depressing reality that the universe is meaningless’, which made a lot of sense to me. To me, this is what Medusa stood for. There are many different interpretations, but this was mine. ” 

With the track "No Passage for the Dead" Holmes expressed his skeptical attitude towards the belief in the afterlife, calling it "a ridiculous man-made notion, [...] initially a theory invented to profit clever individuals, aimed at weak, frightened people." He conceded that not sharing this belief is not "a nice thought", but on the other hand could "make you appreciate the time you have, and live life to the fullest."

Touring
In support of the album's release, the band toured Europe during the Fall of 2017, with support from Pallbearer and Sinistro. In December, an Australian tour followed (their first in over six years), while also gradually announcing a UK tour in February, multiple festival slots for the Summer of 2018 and a Central/South American tour in September.

Track listing

Critical reception

Medusa received high critical praise. Andy Walmsley of Terrorizer gave the album eight and a half points out of ten and considered it "one of the darkest, heaviest, and doomiest albums of their career", with "some of the most gloriously grim riffs, cruelly catchy melodies, and spine-tingling vocals (both harsh and clean) that the band have ever recorded." Dom Lawson, comparing Medusa to its predecessor album The Plague Within in his positive review in Metal Hammer, thought that "to a certain extent Medusa is simply more of the same. Only slower and heavier." He concluded: "This is still the sound of noble veterans driving the dark heart of their music forwards and onto new terrain. It's just that a dark and scary world needs music that speaks the truth about mankind's accursed frailty. Few do it better, or with more monstrous power, than this."

Accolades

Charts

Credits

Paradise Lost
 Nick Holmes – vocals; lyrics
 Greg Mackintosh – lead guitars; keyboards, music
 Aaron Aedy – rhythm guitar
 Steve Edmondson – bass
 Waltteri Väyrynen – drums

Additional musicians
 Steve Crobar – backing vocals (2)
 Heather Mackintosh – backing vocals (6)

References

Death metal albums
Paradise Lost (band) albums
2017 albums
Nuclear Blast albums